The Institute of Mathematical Problems of Biology RAS is a research institute specializing in computational biology and bioinformatics. The objective of the institute is elaboration of mathematical and computational methods for biological research, as well as implementation of these methods directly addressing the problems of computational biology.

Since 2016, it has been renamed into the Institute of Mathematical Problems of Biology RAS – the Branch of Keldysh Institute of Applied Mathematics of Russian Academy of Sciences (IMPB RAS – Branch of KIAM RAS).

The Institute publishes the scientific journal "Mathematical biology & bioinformatics".

Structure of the Institute
Affiliated to the Institute are:
 Laboratory of Macromolecular Crystallography
 Laboratory of Quantum-Mechanical Systems
 Laboratory of Molecular Dynamics
 Laboratory of Neural Networks
 Laboratory of Applied Mathematics
 Laboratory of Bioinformatics
 Laboratory of Computational Ecology
 Laboratory of Data Processing
 Department of Prospective Information Technologies
 Group for Computer Modelling of Nanostructures and Biosystems
 Department of Computing and Informational Resources

Scientific activity

Research directions
 Theoretical development;
 theoretical foundations of nanobioelectronics;
 development of spectro-analytical methods of data processing of results of biological experiments;
 development of numerical methods of data processing of results of biological experiments;
 analytical solutions of Integro-differential equations;
 methods of analysis of dynamical systems.
 Data processing 
 analysis of the activity of the human brain;
 development of methods for assessing biodiversity of vegetation cover;
 development of algorithms and programs for the study of genomic sequences;
 development of computer methods of research of the primary structures of biopolymers;
 development of novel methods of deciphering the structure of complexes of biological macromolecules on the basis of data on the scattering of X-rays and neutrons;
 development of methods for obtaining, processing and analysis of digital image in biology and medicine.
 Computational biology 
 simulation of dynamics of biomolecular systems;
 neural network models of information processing in the brain structures;
 growing random graphs and their application in mathematical neurobiology;
 study of models of voltage-gated ion channels in excitable biomembranes;
 software for studying cell metabolism;
 Mathematical models in biomechanics;
 numerical solution of problems of cardiophysics.
 Synergetics (including topics such as: dynamic system, chaos theory, nonequilibrium thermodynamics, systems biology)
 study of nonlinear models of autolocalized states in condensed matter;
 asymptotic methods and numerical modelling in the study of excitation waves;
 the theory of bifurcation in functional differential equations and phenomena bifurcation memory.
 Bioinformatics
 Concurrent computing 
  development of high-performance computer cluster;
 CUDA technology.

Specialized research projects
 The project "Mathematical Cell";
 The project "Generalized Spectral-Analytical Method" (GSAM).

Teaching and social activities

On the basis of the institute, the mathematical faculty of the Pushchino University was founded in 1994.

Starting from 2006, every two years Institute holds a conference "Mathematical Biology and Bioinformatics".

History

Milestones
The Institute of Mathematical Problems of Biology RAS (IMPB RAS) was founded in 1972. When organized, the Institute received the name of the Research Computing Centre (RCC) of the USSR Academy of Sciences. In 1992 the Research Computing Centre was reorganized into the Institute of Mathematical Problems of Biology RAS.

As a result of the reorganization in RAS of 2015–16 IMPB has become a branch of KIAM since 15 February 2016.

Principals
 1972–98 Molchanov, Albert Makarievich, director, mathematician.
 1998–2016 Lakhno, Viktor Dmitrievich, director, mathematician.
 since 2016 Lakhno, Viktor Dmitrievich, branch manager, mathematician.

Famous faculty and alumni
 Dedus, Florence Fyodorovich
 Molchanov, Albert Makarievich
 Shnol, Emmanuel El'evich

References

External links
 Institute web site

Educational institutions established in 1972
Mathematical institutes
Institutes of the Russian Academy of Sciences
Universities and institutes established in the Soviet Union
Research institutes in the Soviet Union
1972 establishments in the Soviet Union